Ragheb Gul Aga (born 10 July 1984) is a Kenyan cricketer, who played as an all-rounder for Kenya in ODIs and T20Is and for Sussex in English domestic cricket. He became Kenya's third captain in two months in November 2004 when he captained the team at the Intercontinental Cup Finals in place of Hitesh Modi.
also related to filmstar Salma agha

County career
In 2008, having acquired a British passport, Aga signed a one-year deal to play County cricket for Sussex, having played List A cricket for the county during the 2007 season. He was, however, surprisingly recalled to the Kenya side in 2008.  Aga spent a further two seasons at Sussex, finally being released by the county at the end of the 2010 season.

Records
Aga was the first batsman to score a T20I half-century when batting at number 8 (or lower), when he scored 52 not out against Scotland on 13 November 2013. This was the highest score at this position until it was exceeded by Simi Singh in 2018.

References

External links
 
 

1984 births
Living people
Cricketers from Nairobi
Kenyan cricketers
Kenyan Muslims
Kenya One Day International cricketers
Kenya Twenty20 International cricketers
Kenyan cricket captains
Sussex cricketers